Lovability is a company that designs, manufactures, and markets condoms, personal lubricant, and other sexual health & wellness products. Based in Los Angeles, the company sells a variety of products, including male condoms.

History 
Lovability was founded in New York City in 2014 by mother and daughter Pam and Tiffany Gaines. Tiffany, a NYU graduate with a degree in Social Entrepreneurship, was the company's initial president and CEO. Gaines was also a graduate student in the Design for Social Innovation program at the School of Visual Arts. Prior to starting Lovability, Gaines was a Corporate Innovations Consultant for Hyatt Hotels. Her mother Pam has thirty years of experience as an entrepreneur.

Gaines credits her personal experience as inspiration for the company and product. She explained that she was purchasing tampons at a convenience store in front of a group of men. The tampons were located high on a shelf behind the register, next to the condoms, and the clerk had to retrieve an "orange-picking" claw to get them. This led to the idea to change the perception of condoms as a male-oriented product and to destigmatize their purchase and carrying by women. The result of this idea was condoms in gold wrappers that come in small tins, aimed to be more aesthetically appealing than traditional condoms.

Ownership Change 
In February 2019, Lovability was acquired by a women-led investor group led by sexual wellness pioneer and inventor of The WaterSlyde, Maureen Pollack, Co-owners Kamini Sharma and John Paul Basile are former sports and entertainment senior executives.

Operations 
The company has multiple marketing and operational objectives that were laid out in a 2013 Forbes article. An eight-point plan was presented that includes:
 Making condoms available for purchase in places that condoms aren’t typically available such as beauty supply stores, lingerie stores, department stores, and accessory boutiques
 The use of packaging that is "chic, discrete, and resembles a high-end cosmetic product".
 Promotion of condoms on college campuses to educate others on the importance of safe sex and use the product to raise money for their designated philanthropy.
 Encouraging women to take charge of their sexual health and practice self-love.
 Use of an e-commerce website so that women can send condoms either with a personalized note or anonymously.
 Use of celebrity spokespeople, such as the cast members of MTV’s Teen Mom series.
 Engaging women of all ages.
 Being responsive and adaptive based on customer feedback.

Fundraising 
In 2015, Lovability started a funding campaign on the crowd funding website IndieGoGo. The campaign met its goal and  had attained 184% of its targeted amount. In conjunction with the campaign, they produced a video based on testimony from individuals found in New York's Union Square to show why women are resistant to carrying condoms.

Chase bank 
In 2014, the company was initially rejected by Chase Paymentech services "as processing sales for adult-oriented products is a prohibited vertical" and was told that it was a "reputational risk" to process payment for condoms. Gaines then started a petition to ask Chase to review and change its policy of classifying condoms as an "adult-oriented product". The petition gained 3,400 signatures in its first week. The bank later reversed its decision and invited Gaines to submit an application citing that it was already doing business with a "wide variety of merchants, including grocers and drug stores, that sell similar products." Gaines stated that she does not plan to use Chase Paymentech's services until she feels confident that no other condom companies will face the resistance that she did.

References 

Condom brands